Sergei Aleksandrovich Orlov (born 20 April 1989) is a Russian professional football player. He plays for FC Balashikha.

Club career
He played in the Russian Football National League for FC Fakel Voronezh in 2018.

External links
 
 
 

1989 births
People from Ozyory, Moscow Oblast
Sportspeople from Moscow Oblast
Living people
Russian footballers
Association football midfielders
FC Tekstilshchik Ivanovo players
FC Fakel Voronezh players
FC Lukhovitsy players
Russian First League players
Russian Second League players
Armenian First League players
Armenian Premier League players
Russian expatriate footballers
Expatriate footballers in Armenia
Russian expatriate sportspeople in Armenia